Kitty and the World Conference is a 1939 German comedy film directed by Helmut Käutner and starring Hannelore Schroth, Fritz Odemar and Christian Gollong. It is a screwball comedy set against the backdrop of an international peace conference. Following the outbreak of the Second World War, Propaganda minister Joseph Goebbels ordered it withdrawn from cinemas as it he felt it presented too favourable a view of Britain.

It was shot at the Babelsberg Studios in Berlin. The film's sets were designed by art director Max Mellin. The story was based on a play, which served as the basis for the 1956 remake Kitty and the Great Big World.

Cast

References

Bibliography

External links 
 
 Kitty und die Weltkonferenz Full movie at the Deutsche Filmothek

1939 films
Films of Nazi Germany
German comedy films
1939 comedy films
1930s German-language films
Films directed by Helmut Käutner
Terra Film films
German black-and-white films
1930s German films
Films shot at Babelsberg Studios